Amesoeurs (/ɑmsœʁ/, French: "Soulmates") is the only full-length album by Amesoeurs. It was released in 2009, just before the band broke up. Northern Silence Productions released a special limited LP edition of the album in three different versions: the "Metallic Century" edition, limited to 333 copies, the "Cold Light" edition limited to 333 copies, and the "Night Sky" edition limited to 222 copies, which all come with an exclusive bonus track "Gas in Veins - demo version".

Track listing

Personnel 
Amesoeurs
 Neige – lead vocals, guitar, bass, synths
 Fursy Teyssier – guitar, bass
 Audrey Sylvain – clean vocals, piano
 Winterhalter – drums
Production
 Markus Stock – recording

References 

2009 debut albums
Amesoeurs albums
Profound Lore Records albums
Musical settings of poems by Charles Baudelaire